The Accreditation Service for International Schools, Colleges and Universities (ASIC) is an independent international educational agency based in the United Kingdom. It is an independent, government-approved  accreditation body specializing in the accreditation of schools, colleges, universities, training organizations, and online and distance education providers, both in the UK and overseas. ASIC has been appointed by the United Kingdom Government's Home Office UK Border Agency to inspect colleges seeking to apply for sponsor's licenses from the UK Border Agency.  They serve the purpose of identifying colleges that actually exist and provide an educational service from bogus institutions that exist merely to allow international students to obtain fraudulent visas e.g. require students not to attend.

Notable affiliations 
ASIC is approved by the United Kingdom Government's Home Office to accredit private UK colleges for visa purposes.

In addition, it is a member or affiliate of the following organizations:
 Council for Higher Education Accreditation CHEA International Quality Group 
 Council for Higher Education Accreditation International Directory 
 European Association for Quality Assurance in Higher Education (ENQA) affiliate member
 European Distance and E-learning Network (EDEN)
 NAFSA: Association of International Educators
 British Quality Foundation (BQF)
 United Nations Academic Impact
 British Council reciprocal partner

Note that membership of these umbrella bodies does not confer any status or approval on ASIC.  For example, CHEA explicitly states that 'The Council for Higher Education Accreditation (CHEA) International Quality Group (CIQG) is an initiative associated with CHEA, a nonprofit institutional membership organization that provides coordination of accreditation. Eligibility for membership in CIQG is based solely on criteria published in CIQG documents. These criteria do not include any review, approval, or judgment about the quality of any members. CIQG membership criteria are separate and distinct from criteria for membership in CHEA, are not related to CHEA recognition of accrediting organizations, and do not constitute or connote any evaluation by CHEA of the CIQG member. CIQG Membership does not constitute membership in or review or endorsement by CHEA.'.

2009 criticism: "Man given job of closing bogus colleges was sacked by university" 
In 2009, The Times reported that Maurice Dimmock, ASIC's director and chief officer, had been sacked in 2003 from his job at Northumbria University as director of overseas operations. The article stated that the newspaper had "established that the Home Office received, and ignored, concerns about ASIC and Dimmock before it granted the company a contract. Northumbria University wrote to the UK Home Office in May 2007 to question the role the company was about to be given in distinguishing between genuine and bogus colleges." Universities UK, the advocacy group for British Universities, complained to the UK Immigration Minister concerning ASIC being given an accreditation role in the UK immigration scheme. In a letter to the Home Affairs Committee, Advocacy UK wrote: "There is a lack of information and transparency about (ASIC's) management, governance, and financial structures. Several of the colleges that it accredits have been associated with inappropriate activities." The government response to this was a statement that the 2007 decision was made on the basis of the Office for Standards in Education, Children's Services and Skills's report that they were satisfied with the way ASIC was operating. ASIC responded to the allegations concerning its work of distinguishing between genuine colleges and those acting fraudulently had been hampered  "by the Home Office’s refusal to tell ASIC how many student visas were issued for each college it inspects."

In July 2009, ASIC submitted a response memorandum providing answers to the letter written by Diana Warwick, Baroness Warwick of Undercliffe, Chief Executive of Universities UK in which she had expressed concerns about the government's decision to approve the ASIC as one of the accreditation bodies within the new immigration system. In the response, ASIC provided information as to its accreditation and inspection processes and responded to charges regarding the organization's governance and finances.

Organisation 

As of October 2020, ASIC is based in a semi-detached (duplex) residential property at 13 Yarm Road, Stockton-on-Tees TS18 3NJ. This is also the registered address for Qisan Ltd and Rose Education Foundation Limited.  Its directors were Maurice and Margaret Dimmock.

See also 
 List of recognized higher education accreditation organizations
 Higher education accreditation

References

External links 
 

Accreditation
Education in the European Union
Education in the Borough of Stockton-on-Tees
Educational accreditation
Education fraud in the United Kingdom
Educational organisations based in the United Kingdom
Higher education accreditation
Higher education in the United Kingdom
Organisations based in County Durham
Organizations with year of establishment missing
Quality assurance